SV Mattersburg was an Austrian association football club from Mattersburg, Burgenland.

History
The club was formed in 1922 and played its home games at the 17,100 capacity Pappelstadion. The club played in the Bundesliga since the 2003–04 season. SV Mattersburg drew large crowds, with the average crowd for the 2004–05 season being the second highest in Austria, even though the town of Mattersburg has only 6,300 inhabitants. In the 2006–07 season, Mattersburg finished third in the Bundesliga, the highest position in their history.

Mattersburg was declared bankrupt in August 2020 after their main financial backer, Commerzialbank Mattersburg im Burgenland was closed down following an accounting scandal.

Manager history 
  Martin Wurm (1 July 1991 – 30 June 1992)
  Péter Hannich (1 July 1992 – 31 Dec 1992)
  Christian Janitsch (1 Jan 1993 – 30 June 1994)
  Karl Rosner (1 July 1994 – Sept 14, 2000)
  Ernst Simmel (Sept 14, 2000–31 Dec 2000)
  Günther Schiffer (1 Jan 2001 – 30 Nov 2001)
  Werner Gregoritsch (4 March 2002 – 30 June 2004)
  Muhsin Ertuğral (1 July 2004 – 15 Nov 2004)
  Franz Lederer (17 Nov 2004 – 10 June 2013)
  Alfred Tatar (10 June 2013 – 7 October 2013)
  Franz Lederer – interim (7 October 2013 – 20 December 2013)
  Ivica Vastić (20 December 2013 – 2 January 2017)
  Gerald Baumgartner (2 January 2017 –25 July 2018)
  Klaus Schmidt (26 August 2018 –7 August 2020)

European cup history 
As of December 2008.

Q = Qualifying

References

External links
  
 SV Mattersburg at UEFA.COM
 SV Mattersburg at EUFO.DE
 SV Mattersburg at Weltfussball.de
 SV Mattersburg at Football Squads.co.uk
 SV Mattersburg at National Football Teams.com
 SV Mattersburg at Football-Lineups.com

 
Defunct football clubs in Austria
Association football clubs established in 1922
1922 establishments in Austria
Association football clubs disestablished in 2020